Viktor Gennadyevich Bulatov (born 22 January 1972) is a Russian football coach and a former Russian international football player. He is the manager of FC Chelyabinsk.

Playing career
Bulatov spent the prime years of his career at Spartak Moscow. Apart from Spartak, Bulatov played for various Russian clubs, including Torpedo Moscow, Terek Grozny, Alania Vladikavkaz and had two spells at Krylia Sovetov. 
In summer 2007 as an experienced player he moved to Kazakh champions Astana to strengthen the club in its forthcoming Champions League journey.

On international level, Bulatov made his debut for Russia national football team in a 1998 friendly match defeat to Brazil and played his last game in 2001, against Greece.

Honours
 Russian Premier League champion: 1999, 2000, 2001.
 Russian Cup winner: 2004.
 Russian Cup finalist: 2004 (played in the early stages of the 2003/04 competition for FC Krylia Sovetov Samara, who lost in the final to FC Terek Grozny, for which he was playing at the time).

European club competitions
 UEFA Champions League 1999–2000 with FC Spartak Moscow: 7 games, 1 goal.
 UEFA Cup 1999–2000 with FC Spartak Moscow: 2 games.
 UEFA Champions League 2000–01 with FC Spartak Moscow: 8 games.
 UEFA Champions League 2001–02 with FC Spartak Moscow: 6 games.
 UEFA Intertoto Cup 2002 with FC Krylia Sovetov Samara: 4 games.
 UEFA Cup 2004–05 with FC Terek Grozny: 4 goals.

External links 

Bio at Rusteam

References 

1972 births
Living people
Russian footballers
Russia international footballers
Russian expatriate footballers
Russian Premier League players
FC Dimitrovgrad players
FC Spartak Moscow players
FC Dynamo Stavropol players
PFC Krylia Sovetov Samara players
FC Torpedo Moscow players
FC Spartak Vladikavkaz players
Association football midfielders
FC Zhenis Astana players
Expatriate footballers in Kazakhstan
Expatriate footballers in Bulgaria
FC Akhmat Grozny players
Russian football managers
Russian expatriate sportspeople in Kazakhstan
FC Volgar Astrakhan players
FC SKA-Khabarovsk players
Sportspeople from Chelyabinsk
FC Arsenal Tula managers
FC Torpedo Moscow managers
FC FShM Torpedo Moscow players
Russian expatriate football managers
Armenian Premier League managers
Expatriate football managers in Armenia
Russian expatriate sportspeople in Armenia